General Abdul Hamid Khan  was a senior officer in the Pakistan Army. He served as the Chief of Staff of the Pakistan Army under president Yahya Khan and led the army during the events in the Indo-Pakistani War in 1971. He is accused of inflicting genocide during the Bangladesh Liberation War.

Early career 
Abdul Hamid Khan was born 29 April 1917. He attended the Indian Military Academy, Dehra Dun. He was commissioned as a second lieutenant on the Special List 15 July 1939 and was initially attached to the Somerset Light Infantry for experience from 11 August 1939. His date of commission was later antedated to 28 August 1938 and he was promoted Lieutenant 28 November 1940. He was admitted to the Indian Army 27 August 1940. He was appointed acting Captain then temporary Captain on 23 December 1940. He had been posted to 3rd battalion 10th Baluch Regiment by October 1942.

He was promoted war substantive Captain and temporary Major 3 February 1944. He was briefly an acting Lieut-Col 15 August to 18 October 1945. He had attended a war time staff course.

During the Partition of India, he opted for Pakistan and joined the newly created Pakistan Army, in 1947 he was promoted to Lt-Col and became commanding officer of 6th battalion, Baluch Regiment, he commanded from April 1948 - November 1948. Later he was appointed commanding officer of 3rd battalion, Baluch Regiment, he served in this post from November 1948 to December 1949.

1965 War with India
During the 1965 Indo-Pakistani War, then Major General Abdul Hamid Khan served as the General Officer Commanding (GOC) of 11th Infantry Division at Kasur. This division in addition to 10th Infantry Division under Major General Sarfaraz Khan repelled the Indian thrust at Lahore on 6 September 1965. His division captured the district of Khemkaran in Indian Punjab, though further advances were checked. He then was able to withstand multiple counter-attacks by the Indian Army in an effort to retake Khemkaran.

Career in the Yahya Government
After the Indo-Pak war of 1965, Abdul Hamid Khan was promoted to Lieutenant General and served as the commander of I Corps, then based in Kharian (it is currently based in Mangla). After martial law was imposed by General Yahya Khan on 25 March 1969, Lt Gen Hamid Khan was made the Chief of Staff of the Pakistan Army and Deputy Martial Law Administrator of the country. During that time he briefly held the cabinet portfolio of Home Affairs for four months. He was promoted to full general in August 1969 and was appointed as the Chief of Staff of the Army or in other sense the de facto commander-in-chief of the army in place of Yahya as he was the President. He is accused of war crimes during the 1971 Bangladesh liberation war.

Awards and decorations

Foreign Decorations

References

External links
Hamoodur Rahman Commission Report

Pakistani generals
Generals of the Indo-Pakistani War of 1971
Baloch Regiment officers
Indian Military Academy alumni
British Indian Army officers
1917 births
1984 deaths